Kitchen Boss is an American television series that airs on TLC, hosted by Buddy Valastro, the star of Cake Boss. The weekday series debuted January 25, 2011, with a second season debuting January 31, 2012.

Unlike the documentary series Cake Boss and the reality series Next Great Baker, Kitchen Boss is a studio-based cooking program, in which Valastro cooks various Italian-American dishes from his family's recipes. Valastro is usually joined in the kitchen by members of his family and other special guests.

All the recipes featured in this program feature recipes that can be prepared in minimal time, using ingredients that are easily obtainable and affordable; each meal featured generally consists of the main dish, a side dish and a dessert. Each recipe is also easy to follow, with Valastro referring to the website for additional details and instructions.

Episodes

References

TLC (TV network) original programming
2011 American television series debuts
2012 American television series endings
2010s American cooking television series
American television spin-offs
Reality television spin-offs
English-language television shows
Cake Boss